Timothy James Ecclestone (born September 24, 1947) is a Canadian former professional ice hockey left winger who played eleven seasons in the National Hockey League from 1967 until 1978. Ecclestone played 692 career NHL games, scoring 126 goals and 233 assists for 359 points. He twice scored 50 points or more in his career.

Playing career
Born in Toronto, Ontario, Ecclestone began his career in Junior B with the Etobicoke Indians. After one season he was selected 9th overall by the New York Rangers at the age of 17, in the 1964 NHL Entry Draft. He played one more season of Juniors, his time in Junior A with the Kitchener Rangers. Ecclestone signed with the New York Rangers following the 1966–67 season with Kitchener. However, his rights were traded to the St. Louis Blues immediately following the 1967 NHL Expansion Draft. Ecclestone played three seasons with the Blues before management became unhappy with Red Berenson's association with the NHL Players' Association and cleaned house. Since Ecclestone had some involvement with the NHLPA the Blues decided to trade him to the Detroit Red Wings. The Wings were perennial losers at the time and after four season in Detroit, Ecclestone requested to be traded. The Wings accommodated his request and he was shipped off to the Toronto Maple Leafs. Following a shoulder injury in his second season in Toronto, the leafs traded Ecclestone to the Washington Capitals who in turn traded him to the Atlanta Flames, on the same day. Following a knee injury during the 1977–78 season he served as an assistant coach for the Flames. Ecclestone retired at the end of the season but remained with the Flames as an assistant coach until they relocated to Calgary in 1980.

Ecclestone remained in the Atlanta area following the departure of the Flames organization, as part owner of sports bar named Timothy-John's Restaurant and Lounge in Sandy Springs, Georgia, a restaurant he helped open during his years as a Flames assistant coach. In 1990, he opened his own sports bar, called T.J.'s Sports Bar and Grill, in Alpharetta, Georgia.

Transactions
Traded to St. Louis by New York Rangers with Gary Sabourin, Bob Plager and Gord Kannegiesser for Rod Seiling on June 6, 1967.
Traded to Detroit by St. Louis with Red Berenson for Garry Unger and Wayne Connelly on February 6, 1971.
Traded to Toronto by Detroit for Pierre Jarry on November 29, 1973.
Traded to Washington by Toronto with Willie Brossart for Rod Seiling on November 2, 1974.
Traded to Atlanta by Washington for cash on November 2, 1974.

Career statistics

Regular season and playoffs

References

External links
 

1947 births
Living people
Atlanta Flames coaches
Atlanta Flames players
Canadian ice hockey coaches
Canadian ice hockey left wingers
Detroit Red Wings players
Kansas City Blues players
Kitchener Rangers players
New York Rangers draft picks
St. Louis Blues players
Ice hockey people from Toronto
Toronto Maple Leafs players
Tulsa Oilers (1964–1984) players